List of prisoners of Jasenovac concentration camp (1941–1945). Bolded names in caps and italics indicate those listed below who survived the camp and the war.

List
 Zaim Topčić, writer, communist, Bosnian
  (1882–1942), lawyer and activist, Croatian Jewish
 Petar Baćović, Chetnik commander
 Ante Bakotić (1921–1945), communist, Croat
  (1902–1945), Chetnik commander, Serb
  (1890–1941), Bosnian revolutionary and Soviet agent, Serb
 Julia Batino, Bitola-born Jewish antifascist and women's rights activist.
 Jovo Bećir (1870–1942), brigadier and Yugoslav lieutenant, Montenegrin
 Egon Berger, author of 44 months in Jasenovac, Jewish
  (1911–1944), doctor and communist, Montenegrin
 Slavko Brill (1900–1943), Croatian sculptor and ceramics artist, Jewish.
 Marijan Čavić (1915–1941), communist, Croat
  (1884–1945), Islamist, Bosnian
 Ante Ciliga, Croatian politician, writer and publisher. — Ciliga, a former Communist turned "ardent nationalist", was released within a relatively short period of time. Ciliga himself was quoted as saying: "I was for the ustasha (sic) state, I was for the Croatian state. And I defend that thesis. The ustasha (sic) state needed to be reformed, not destroyed."
  (1884–1941), Croatian lawyer, Jewish
 Natko Devčić, composer, Croat
 Nada Dimić (1923–1942), Partisan, Serb
 Zija Dizdarević, writer and Partisan, Bosnian Muslim
  (1905–1941), communist and Partisan, Croat
 Pavle Đurišić, Chetnik commander, Serb
 Mavro Frankfurter (1875–1942), chief rabbi in Vinkovci
 Grgo Gamulin, art historian, university professor and writer, Croat
 Izidor Gross (1860–1942), chess master and hazzan of the Karlovac Jewish community.
 Boris Hanžeković, Croatian athlete; murdered by the guards during the 22 April 1945 mass inmate breakout.
 Slavko Hirsch, Croatian physician, founder and director of the Epidemiological Institute in Osijek, Jewish.
 Žiga Hirschler, Jewish composer, music critic and publicist.
 Daniel Kabiljo, Bosnian artist, Jewish.
  (1913–1942), author, Croat
  (1905–1942), Partisan, Croat
  (1917–1945), painter, Austria-born Serb, Jewish
  (1904–1945), Yugoslav major and pilot and Chetnik commander, Serb
 Vladko Maček, Croatian politician; president of the Croatian Peasant Party.
 Vukašin Mandrapa (died 1942/1943), proclaimed Serbian Orthodox saint-martyr.
 Mihovil Pavlek Miškina, poet, short story writer and politician, Croat
 Edmund Moster, Jewish entrepreneur, industrialist and co-founder of the "Penkala-Moster Company" (now TOZ).
 Leo Müller, Croatian industrialist and entrepreneur, Jewish.
 Daniel Ozmo, Bosnian–Serbian painter and printmaker, Jewish.
  (1901–?), Bosnian painter, Jewish.
  (1904–1941), Serbian Orthodox hieromonk.
 Rod Riffler (1909–1941), Croatian dancer and choreographer, Jewish.
  (1919–1944), Yugoslav Partisan
 Armin Schreiner, industrialist, banker and activist, Jewish
 Vlado Singer, Croatian politician and member of the Ustaše movement (a convert to Catholicism from Judaism).
  (1880–1941), Bosnian socialist activist and Partisan, Serb
 Simon Ungar, Osijek rabbi
 Oton Vinski, Croatian banker, Jewish.
 Dragiša Vasić, Chetnik commander, Serb.
 Leib Weissberg, Slavonski Brod rabbi.
  (1910–1941), Serbian Orthodox priest, Croatian Serb.

References

Jasenovac concentration camp
Lists of prisoners and detainees